This Way Up is the eleventh studio album by British-Irish singer Chris de Burgh, released in 1994 on A&M Records. Two singles from the album charted in the United Kingdom: "Blonde Hair, Blue Jeans" (No. 51) and "The Snows of New York" (No. 60).

Track listing
All tracks written by Chris de Burgh, except where noted.
"This Silent World" – 4:07
"This Is Love" – 3:47
"This Weight on Me" – 4:04
"Here Is Your Paradise" (de Burgh, Steve Duberry) – 3:28
"Oh My Brave Hearts" (de Burgh, Duberry) – 6:51
"Blonde Hair, Blue Jeans" – 3:25
"The Son and the Father" – 2:49
"Up Here in Heaven" – 5:56
"You Are the Reason" – 4:00
"Love's Got a Hold on Me" (de Burgh, Albert Hammond) – 3:44
"The Snows of New York" (de Burgh, Hammond) – 3:03

Personnel 

 Chris de Burgh – lead and backing vocals
 Victor Martin – keyboards
 Neil Taylor – lead and rhythm guitars
 Phil Spalding – additional rhythm guitar, bass guitar, backing vocals
 Jimmy Copley – drums
 Stephen McDonnell – brass (6)
 Nick Ingman – string arrangements (4, 7, 8)
 The London Session Orchestra – orchestra (4, 7, 8)
 Peter Smith – backing vocals 
 Hannah Clive – backing vocals (6)

Production 

 Produced, engineered and mixed by Peter Smith
 Assistant engineers – Rob Kirwan and Jim Lowe
 Mix assistant – Ben Darlow
 Design – Jeremy Pearce at Stylorouge
 Management – Dave Margereson and Kenny Thomson

Charts and certifications

Weekly charts

Year-end charts

Certifications

References

Chris de Burgh albums
1994 albums
A&M Records albums